Sangu (also spelled Chango, Isangu, Shango, Yisangou, and Yisangu) is a language spoken in Gabon by approximately 20,900 (2000) Masangu people.

Bibliography
 Daniel Franck Idiata, 2006.  Parlons isangu.  (L'Harmattan)

References

External links
 Sangu at WolframAlpha
 "Parlons isangu" (fr) from Google Books

Languages of Gabon
Sira languages